The Redwood Meadow Ranger Station was built in 1938 in Sequoia National Park.  It was designed in 1938 by the National Park Service Branch of Plans and Designs, and was begun the following year and completed by 1941, using Civilian Conservation Corps labor. It is an example of the National Park Service Rustic style. The station consists of the three-room ranger station and a small barn.

References

National Register of Historic Places in Sequoia National Park
Park buildings and structures on the National Register of Historic Places in California
Buildings and structures completed in 1938
1938 establishments in California
Civilian Conservation Corps in California
Log cabins in the United States
National Park Service rustic in Sequoia National Park
Log buildings and structures on the National Register of Historic Places in California